Mildred B. Cooper Memorial Chapel is a chapel in Bella Vista, Arkansas, designed by E. Fay Jones and Maurice Jennings and constructed in 1988. The chapel was commissioned by John A. Cooper, Sr. to honor Mildred Borum Cooper, his late wife. The chapel was designed to celebrate both God and his creations.

Located on a wooded site along Lake Norwood, the chapel has become a popular tourist destination in Northwest Arkansas. It is also popular as a venue for wedding ceremonies.

Architecture

Jones apprenticed with Frank Lloyd Wright, and designed a building with numerous windows open to the landscape.  

Jones used 31 tons of steel and 4,460 square feet of glass to create a series of tall, vertical Gothic arches that run the length of the chapel. Though it looks like an open-air structure, the chapel is glass-enclosed and air conditioned.

Soon after completion, the chapel was praised; a critic said that it "quietly commands a dignity and presence uncommon among buildings of our era."

About Mildred Borum Cooper 
Mildred Borum Cooper, born and raised in Arkansas, spent much of her life in service to her people and community. She was president of United Methodist Women's organizations, served in the Girl Scout organization, worked as postmistress, and organized the first garden club, home extension club, and library in Cherokee Village.

See also
 Thorncrown Chapel (1980), designed by Jones in nearby Eureka Springs, Arkansas

References

External links 

 Cooper Chapel official website.

Chapels in the United States
Churches completed in 1988
Churches in Benton County, Arkansas
Tourist attractions in Benton County, Arkansas
Buildings and structures in Bella Vista, Arkansas
Wedding chapels in the United States
1988 establishments in Arkansas